María Kosti (born 29 April 1951) is a Spanish actress.  She has starred in many Spanish television series and horror films.

Early life and career
María was born María Soledad Mesa Pashón in Madrid, Spain.  Her acting career began in 1966, in which she began acting in television.  She appeared on the Spanish television series Escala en hi-fi, a reality music show in which unknown actors would chat about their opinions of the hits of the day.  Not long after, she made her film debut in 1967 with Dos mil dólares por Coyote.  María has appeared in several television series including Hora once, Compañera  te doy, Novela, and Estudion 1.  María has also appeared in many films throughout her acting career, notably horror films including El perfil de Satanás (Satan's Profile), La endemonaida (The Demonic), Exorcismo, and La noche de las gaviotas (Night of the Seagulls), the fourth and final film in the Blind Dead series.

Filmography

References

External links
 

1951 births
Spanish film actresses
Spanish television actresses
Living people
Actresses from Madrid